Cecil Crawford O'Gorman (1874 – 1943) was an Irish mining engineer, chemist and painter.

Life
Cecil Crawford O'Gorman was born in Ireland in 1874. He was the son of John O'Gorman, and the grandson of Charles O'Gorman, the first British consul to Mexico in 1823. O'Gorman studied engineering in Dublin.

O'Gorman moved to Mexico to work for a British mining company in 1895. Following ill-health from working in mining areas, O'Gorman became a chemist. He met and married his distant cousin in Mexico, Encarnación O'Gorman. They had four children, architect Juan, historian Edmundo, Margarita and Tomás. In his 1973 autobiography, his son Juan recounted the family's experience of the Mexican revolution and the bravery and piety of O'Gorman in protecting his family.

He commissioned his son Juan to design and build a house for him and his wife in 1928, which would become the first modernist house in Mexico. The house, known as the "Cecil O'Gorman House", is in San Ángel colonia and is beside the Rivera-Kahlo house which was completed in 1932. In 2012, the National Institute of Fine Arts purchased the house.

O'Gorman attended classes given by Saturnino Herrán, and travelled to France to improve his painting. He was among the circle of painters who were central to the "Mexican Renaissance" such as Alfonso Michel, Manuel González Serrano, and Emilio Baz Viaud. He became well known for his portraiture, landscapes and murals. His work is seen as conventional and representational. A retrospective exhibition was held at Palacio de Bellas Artes after his death in 1943.

External links
self portrait of O'Gorman, 1936

References

1874 births
1943 deaths
20th-century Irish painters
Irish male painters
20th-century Irish male artists